Affad 23 is an African archaeological site located in alluvial deposits formed by an ancient channel of the Nile in the Affad District of Southern Dongola in northern Sudan.

In 2013, archaeologists from the 'Institute of Archaeology and Ethnology, Polish Academy of Sciences' in Poznań, unearthed the remains of a settlement with numerous postholes, pits and hearths estimated to be 50,000 years old. Previously it was believed that permanent structures were associated with the exodus from Africa and the consequent occupation of regions in Europe and Asia. The position of the site, lithic artefacts collected in 2003 and 2012-2014, freshness, refittings and dispersion of the artefacts all suggest that it was a late Middle Stone Age workshop used intermittently and for short periods.

References

Archaeological sites in Sudan
Archaeological discoveries with year of discovery missing